Doc Corkle is an American sitcom that was broadcast on NBC Television from October 5 through October 19, 1952. The show was cancelled after 3 episodes and replaced by Mister Peepers. Insufficient ratings were reported to be the cause of the switch.

Premise
The series focused on Doc Corkle, a dentist with both money and eccentric-relative problems. Good natured Doctor Ambrose Corkle is a widower who lives with his sister Nellie, teenage daughter Laurie, and his father Simon, who tries to help out by fixing things, though his repairs aren't always successful. His well-meaning, but blundering, cousin Melinda has a wealthy son named Winfield "Windy" Dill, who is attracted to Laurie, though the teen is not interested in him. Since many of Doc Corkle's patients fail to pay him, he has to ask Windy for financial assistance.

Cast
Eddie Mayehoff as Doc Corkle 
Billie Burke as Melinda Dill
Arnold Stang as Winfield "Windy" Dill
Hope Emerson as Nellie Corkle
Connie Marshall as Laurie Corkle
Chester Conklin as Simon Corkle

Production
The program was filmed by Key Productions at Eagle-Lion Studios in Hollywood. The producer was Lou Place, and the director was Dick Bare. Writers were Bob Fisher, Devery Freeman, and Alan Lipscott.

Schedule and competition 
Doc Corkle was broadcast on Sunday nights from 7:30 to 8, Eastern Time. The competing network shows were This is Show Business on CBS and Hot Seat on ABC.

See also

1952-53 United States network television schedule

References

External links
Doc Corkle at IMDB

1952 American television series debuts
1952 American television series endings
NBC original programming
English-language television shows
Black-and-white American television shows